Released in 2011 by Deep Shag Records, On the Road with Ellison Volume 5 is a massive 3CD deluxe set chronicling Harlan Ellison’s three days in Madison, Wisconsin at MadCon 2010. The release features an exclusive new Ellison essay written for this release. At 76, Mr. Ellison has stated publicly that MadCon 2010 would be his final convention appearance ever.

Track listing
On the Road with Ellison Volume 5 is intended to be listened to as a whole and is broken up into individual tracks only for easier navigation. Sound recorded and engineered by Brad James Beske.

Disc one
A Warning
Friday Part 1
Friday Part 2
Friday Part 3
Friday Part 4
Friday Part 5
Friday Part 6
Friday Part 7
Friday Part 8
Friday Part 9
Friday Part 10
Friday Part 11
Saturday Part 1
Saturday Part 2
Saturday Part 3

Disc two
Saturday Part 4
Saturday Part 5
Saturday Part 6
Saturday Part 7
Saturday Part 8
Saturday Part 9
Saturday Part 10
Saturday Banquet Part 1
Saturday Banquet Part 2
Saturday Banquet Part 3
Saturday Banquet Part 4
Saturday Banquet Part 5
Saturday Banquet Part 6
Saturday Banquet Part 7
Saturday Banquet Part 8

Disc three
Saturday Banquet Part 9
Sunday Part 1
Sunday Part 2
Sunday Part 3
Sunday Part 4
Sunday Part 5
Sunday Part 6
Sunday Part 7
Sunday Part 8
Sunday Part 9
Sunday Part 10
Sunday Part 11
Sunday Part 12
Sunday Part 13
Sunday Part 14

References
 Fingerprints on the Sky: The Authorized Harlan Ellison Bibliography, Richmond, T. (2017). Edgeworks Abbey/Subterranean Press.

External links
Deep Shag Records listing for the album
All Music Guide review

2011 live albums
Harlan Ellison albums
Deep Shag Records albums
2010s spoken word albums
Spoken word albums by American artists
Live spoken word albums